Stocker Park is a  park at the eastern end of E. Clarendon Street in Gladstone, Oregon, United States. The landscaped park serves as a memorial to a former resident.

References

Gladstone, Oregon
Parks in Clackamas County, Oregon